Fahad Hamad Al-Yamani (born 23 November 1989) is a Saudi Arabian footballer who plays as a midfielder for Jeddah.

Honours

Al-Shabab
 Saudi Premier League: 2011–12

Al-Ahli
 Saudi Premier League: 2015–16
 King Cup: 2016
 Saudi Super Cup: 2016

References

1989 births
Living people
Association football midfielders
Sportspeople from Riyadh
Saudi Arabian footballers
Al-Ahli Saudi FC players
Al-Shabab FC (Riyadh) players
Al-Taawoun FC players
Al-Faisaly FC players
Ohod Club players
Al-Diriyah Club players
Al-Shoulla FC players
Al-Ansar FC (Medina) players
Jeddah Club players
Saudi Professional League players
Saudi First Division League players
Saudi Second Division players